Johanna Anneke Snyman also known as just Anneke Snyman (born 6 May 1994) is a South African international lawn bowler.

Biography
She was born in Cape Town, South Africa and won the triples and fours bronze medals at the Atlantic Bowls Championships.

She was selected as part of the South African team for the 2018 Commonwealth Games on the Gold Coast in Queensland where she claimed a silver medal in the Fours with Elma Davis, Esme Kruger and Nicolene Neal.

In 2019 she won the fours silver medal and triples bronze medal at the Atlantic Bowls Championships and in 2020 she moved clubs from Bredasdorp BC to Western Province Cricket Club.

In 2022, she competed in the women's triples and the Women's fours at the 2022 Commonwealth Games. In the fours the team of Snyman, Esme Kruger, Thabelo Muvhango and Bridget Calitz reached the final and won a silver medal after losing in the final 17-10 to India.

References

1994 births
Living people
Sportspeople from Cape Town
Bowls players at the 2018 Commonwealth Games
Bowls players at the 2022 Commonwealth Games
South African female bowls players
Commonwealth Games silver medallists for South Africa
Commonwealth Games medallists in lawn bowls
Medallists at the 2018 Commonwealth Games
Medallists at the 2022 Commonwealth Games